Melvin Lloyd Hansen (born July 11, 1911, Redfield, South Dakota – Died June 5, 1963, San Bernardino, California) was an American racecar driver. Hansen was nicknamed the "Firecracker Kid" because he loved to throw the explosive devices under chairs and behind people who were gathered in groups.

Racing career
Hansen grew up in Bloomington, California and began racing in stock cars in 1931 at the Riverside Fairgrounds. He continued to race these cars at other Inland Empire tracks in Riverside and Colton in the early 1930s. As this early version of track roadsters waned, he switched to midget car racing, where he achieved great success.

Midget car career
Hansen's first big win was the 1939 Turkey Night Grand Prix at Gilmore Stadium in Rex Mays' Offenhauser. Hansen raced his midget car throughout the nation in 1940, and won 53 features that season. He also claimed the track championship at Fort Miami Speedway in Toledo, Ohio that season. He won the 1942 track championship at VFW Motor Speedway in Detroit. Hansen raced in the United Racing Association in California, and won the 1945 URA Blue Circuit championship.

Championship car career
Hansen competed in six Indianapolis 500s. He best finish was an eighth-place finish in the 1940 Indianapolis 500. He won the 100-mile AAA Championship race at Atlanta, Georgia in 1948, and won the 100-mile AAA Championship race at Springfield, Illinois in 1949.

Accident
Hansen was paralyzed after a midget racing crash on September 8, 1949 at Detroit, and he died on June 5, 1963 in San Bernardino, California after being a paraplegic for fifteen years.

Career award
Hansen was inducted in the National Midget Auto Racing Hall of Fame in 1993.

Complete AAA Championship Car results

Indy 500 results

References

1911 births
1963 deaths
Indianapolis 500 drivers
Racing drivers from South Dakota
People from Hamlin County, South Dakota
AAA Championship Car drivers